This is a list of Punjabi films of 2010.

List of films

References

External links 
 Punjabi films at the Internet Movie Database

2010
Punjabi